Brendan Murphy (born 19 August 1975) is an Irish former footballer who played soccer for the Republic of Ireland U21 and B national teams and Gaelic football for the Meath county team.

Career

Soccer
Murphy played as a goalkeeper with Bradford City and Wimbledon where he played for 5 seasons. Murphy did not play in a league match for Wimbledon, but he appeared in Intertoto Cup matches. In 1999 Murphy moved back to Ireland where he played for a season with Dundalk before returning to play his final 2-year stint in England with Kidderminster Harriers in 2000. Murphy won eight Republic of Ireland under-21 caps and one B cap. He was also called up to the senior team by manager Mick McCarthy for an away international friendly match against Wales in 1997, although he remained an unused substitute.

Gaelic football
Murphy subsequently returned home to Trim, County Meath where he began playing Gaelic football for Trim GAA. In 2005, he was called up to the senior Meath county squad under Seán Boylan. He made his senior inter-county debut on 9 January in an O'Byrne Cup match against Kildare. He made his championship debut in 2006 v Louth. Apart from a brief exit from the squad in 2009 Murphy played until the age of 35 and retired in 2011. In 2012, he was appointed Meath goalkeeping coach. He was an all star nominee in 2007.

Honours
 Leinster Senior Football Championship (1): 2010
 All-Ireland and Leinster Minor Football Championship (1): 1992
Leinster minor football 1993
 NFL division 2 winner 2007
 All star nominee 2007

References

External links
 GAA profile at gaainfo.com

1975 births
Living people
Gaelic football goalkeepers
Gaelic football goalkeeping coaches
Gaelic footballers who switched code
Meath inter-county Gaelic footballers
Trim Gaelic footballers
Republic of Ireland association footballers
Republic of Ireland B international footballers
Republic of Ireland under-21 international footballers
Association football goalkeepers
Expatriate footballers in England
Association footballers from County Meath
Bradford City A.F.C. players
Dundalk F.C. players
Kidderminster Harriers F.C. players
Longford Town F.C. players
Wimbledon F.C. players
Association footballers from County Wexford
Wexford Gaelic footballers